Ararendá is a municipality in the state of Ceará in the Northeast region of Brazil. As of 2020, the estimated municipality population is 10,959 people.

See also
List of municipalities in Ceará

References

Municipalities in Ceará